Solid as a Rock is a 1989 album by The Shooters.

"Solid as a Rock" is also the name of several songs, by the following artists, appearing on the following albums with dates:
"Solid as a Rock", written by Bob Hilliard & David Mann
Count Basie and His Sextet, instrumental single (1949)
Ella Fitzgerald with Sy Oliver's Orchestra, single (1950), with lyrics by Teeona Fitzgerald
Lee "Scratch" Perry, Chicken Scratch (1989)
David Mullen, Faded Blues (1995)
Sizzla,  Da Real Thing (2002) and The Overstanding (2006)
Bim Sherman, single (2006) and Miracle (2006)
The Fenicians, Stoned Moments (2006)
John Hogan, Where I Come From (2006)
The Nazarenes, Rock Firm (2008)

See also
The line "solid as a rock" appears in "Solid", a 1984 song by Ashford & Simpson